Vale of Neath Railway 0-6-0ST locomotives were  steam locomotives for working the heavy goods traffic on the Vale of Neath Railway and its associated lines in Wales. The first of 13 broad gauge locomotives entered service in 1854 and the last was withdrawn in 1886. The remaining four were standard gauge locomotives.

The Vale of Neath Railway was amalgamated into the Great Western Railway on 1 February 1865. The broad gauge locomotives retained their old numbers, but the standard gauge ones were renumbered.

Broad gauge

Rebuilt 4-4-0STs

 7 (c.1858 – 1874)
 8 (c.1858 – 1880)
 9 (c.1858 – 1878)

Three small-wheeled 4-4-0ST locomotives had been built by Robert Stephenson and Company in 1854, but by 1858 they had all been rebuilt as s and, as such, the last was withdrawn in 1880.

Small Vulcan locomotives

 10 (1854 – 1880)
 11 (1854 – 1878)
 12 (1854 – 1884)

The first s delivered to the Vale of Neath Railway came from the Vulcan Foundry in 1854. Built to the same design as the South Devon Railway Tornado class with  water tanks. The last one was withdrawn in 1884.

Large Vulcan locomotives

 13 (1856 – 1875)
 14 (1856 – 1872)
 15 (1857 – 1874)

A second batch of s with longer  tanks were delivered in 1856. They also had a shorter wheelbase, larger cylinders and different valve gear. They were altered to  tender locomotives after 1860 and were all withdrawn by 1875.

Slaughter, Grüning locomotives

 16 (1861 – 1886)
 17 (1861 – 1885)
 18 (1861 – 1872)
 19 (1861 – 1875)

Four more broad gauge s were delivered in 1861, this time from the Bristol builders, Slaughter, Grüning and Company, similar to the South Devon Railway Dido class that they had built the previous year. The last one was withdrawn in 1886.

In 1865 No. 16 was hauling a train of coal wagons at Swansea when it fell into the harbour, a moving bridge having been left open. The two men on the locomotive were killed.

Standard gauge
Four standard gauge  locomotives were built by two different manufacturers, two by Robert Stephenson and Company, and two by the Vulcan Foundry.
 20 (GWR No. 413)
 21 (GWR No. 414)
 22 (GWR No. 415)
 23 (GWR No. 416)

References
 
 
 

Broad gauge (7 feet) railway locomotives
0-6-0ST locomotives
Vale of Neath Railway
Robert Stephenson and Company locomotives
Vulcan Foundry locomotives
Avonside locomotives
Railway locomotives introduced in 1854
Scrapped locomotives
Standard gauge steam locomotives of Great Britain